Line 3 of Foshan Metro (FMetro) is a metro line in Foshan that runs  between  in Chancheng District and  in Shunde District. The inital section of its first phase opened on 28 December 2022, with the rest of the phase expected to be complete by the end of 2023.

Stations

References 

Foshan Metro lines
Railway lines opened in 2022